Pseudoviviania is a genus of flies in the family Tachinidae.

Species
Pseudoviviania platypoda Brauer & von Bergenstamm, 1891

Distribution
Venezuela.

References

Monotypic Brachycera genera
Diptera of South America
Exoristinae
Tachinidae genera
Taxa named by Friedrich Moritz Brauer
Taxa named by Julius von Bergenstamm